Makuti is thatching made from the sun-dried leaves of the coconut palm Cocos nucifera. It is widely used across East Africa.

References

Further reading
 Makuti Land.
 Build in Watamu.

Roofing materials
Palm trees in culture